The Creatress is a 2019 American comedy-drama film directed by Jason Cook and starring Lindy Booth, Peter Bogdanovich and Fran Drescher.

Cast
 Fran Drescher as Carrie O'Connor
 Peter Bogdanovich as Theo Mencken
 Lindy Booth as Eryn Bellow
 Kayla Ewell as Lacey
 David Lago as Rand
 Luke Guldan as Seth
 Francis Lloyd Corby as Brad
 Dante Basco as Frankin

References

External links
 

American comedy-drama films
2019 comedy-drama films
2010s English-language films
2010s American films